Henry Holbrook (July 11, 1820 – May 11, 1902) was an English-born merchant and political figure in British Columbia. He represented New Westminster City in the Legislative Assembly of British Columbia from 1871 to 1875.

The son of Samuel Holbrook, he was born in Northwich and was educated in Witton, Cheshire. Holbrook entered business as a merchant in Liverpool. He was a contractor during the Crimean War and later lived in Odessa, Ukraine. Holbrook came to Victoria, British Columbia at the start of the Fraser Canyon Gold Rush of 1858. He settled in New Westminster the following year when it became the capital of the Colony of British Columbia, opening a store there. He served as alderman on the municipal council, also serving as president of the council (mayor). In 1864, he ran unsuccessfully to represent New Westminster District in the Colonial Assembly of British Columbia but was elected for Douglas and Lillooet District. Holbrook opposed the union of the colonies of Vancouver Island and British Columbia in 1866, which led to Victoria becoming the capital.

Although he developed some doubts, Holbrook generally supported union with Canada. In 1870, he went to Ottawa as an unofficial delegate to discuss the terms of union. In 1871, he was named Chief Commissioner of Land and Works in the provincial cabinet; he then became president of the Executive Council instead. Holbrook was defeated when he ran for reelection in 1875. In 1880, he returned to England for his health. Although he never returned, Holbrook retained an interest in British Columbia. In 1884, he published British Columbia gold mines; a paper read before the Liverpool Geological Association .... He died at Talbot House in Parkgate at the age of 81.

References 

1820 births
1902 deaths
English emigrants to pre-Confederation British Columbia
Independent MLAs in British Columbia
Members of the Executive Council of British Columbia
Mayors of New Westminster
Members of the Colonial Assembly of British Columbia
People from Northwich